Elachista subnigrella is a moth of the family Elachistidae found in Europe.

Description
The head is dark grey, face lighter. Forewings blackish-grey, light-sprinkled, in female darker except on basal area ; a slender indistinct fascia before middle, somewhat indented or interrupted on fold, in male sometimes almost obsolete, a small indistinct tornal spot, and costal spot somewhat beyond it whitish, in female whiter and more distinct. Hindwings are rather dark grey.The larva is pale yellow ; head pale brown. Hindwings are grey.

Biology
Adults are on wing from April to May.
The larvae feed on Avena, Avenula pubescens, Bromus erectus, Calamagrostis epigejos, Dactylis glomerata, Festuca and Holcus mollis. They mine the leaves of their host plant. The mine has the form of a narrow, flat corridor, descending from the leaf tip. The frass is deposited in a continuous line. A single larva may make several mines. Pupation takes place outside of the mine. They are pale yellow with a light brown head. Larvae can be found from April to May and again in July.

Distribution
It is found from Scandinavia and the Baltic States to the Pyrenees and Italy and from Ireland to Romania.

References

subnigrella
Leaf miners
Moths described in 1853
Moths of Europe
Taxa named by John William Douglas